Magasan-e Olya (also Romanized as Magasān-e ‘Olyā; also known as Magasān and Mohammadabad (Persian: محمدآباد), also Romanized as Moḩammadābād) is a village in Bardesareh Rural District, Oshtorinan District, Borujerd County, Lorestan Province, Iran. At the 2006 census, its population was 207, in 45 families.

References 

Towns and villages in Borujerd County